Zheng Qing (born 15 September 1959) is a Chinese water polo player. He competed in the men's tournament at the 1988 Summer Olympics.

References

1959 births
Living people
Chinese male water polo players
Olympic water polo players of China
Water polo players at the 1988 Summer Olympics
Place of birth missing (living people)
20th-century Chinese people